The Very Best of Chic & Sister Sledge   is a compilation album of recordings by American R&B bands Chic and Sister Sledge, released by Rhino Records/Warner Music in 1999. An expanded two-disc edition of the compilation was released by Warner Music in 2005, under the title Good Times: The Very Best of the Hits & the Remixes.

Track listing
All tracks written by Bernard Edwards and Nile Rodgers unless otherwise noted.
"We Are Family" (7" Edit)  - 3:21
 Performed by: Sister Sledge. Original version appears on 1979 album We Are Family
"Good Times" (7" Edit)  - 3:38
 Performed by: Chic. Original version appears on 1979 album Risqué
"Lost in Music" (7" Edit)  - 3:21
 Performed by: Sister Sledge. Original version appears on 1979 album We Are Family
"Le Freak" (7" Edit)  - 3:32
 Performed by: Chic. Original version appears on 1978 album C'est Chic
"He's the Greatest Dancer"  - 6:10
 Performed by: Sister Sledge. From 1979 album We Are Family
"I Want Your Love" (7" Edit)  - 3:23
 Performed by: Chic. Original version appears on 1978 album C'est Chic
"Everybody Dance" (7" Edit)  - 4:09
 Performed by: Chic. Original version appears on 1977 album Chic
"Dance, Dance, Dance (Yowsah, Yowsah, Yowsah)" (7" Edit) (Edwards, Lehman, Rodgers) - 3:40
 Performed by: Chic. Original version appears on 1977 album Chic
"Thinking of You"   - 4:27
 Performed by: Sister Sledge. From 1979 album We Are Family
"Frankie" (Denny) - 3:52
 Performed by: Sister Sledge. From 1985 album When The Boys Meet The Girls
"We Are Family" (Sure Is Pure Remix, Radio Edit)  - 3:57
 Performed by: Sister Sledge. Original version appears on 1979 album We Are Family
"Lost in Music" (Sure Is Pure Remix)  - 5:02
 Performed by: Sister Sledge. Original version appears on 1979 album We Are Family
"I Want Your Love" (Stonebridge Remix)  - 8:43
 Performed by: Chic. Original version appears on 1978 album C'est Chic
"Good Times" (A Touch of Jazz Remix)  - 5:15
 Performed by: Chic. Original version appears on 1979 album Risqué
"He's the Greatest Dancer" (Brutal Bill Remix)  - 5:29
 Performed by: Sister Sledge. Original version appears on 1979 album We Are Family
"Thinking of You" (Ramp Remix)  - 7:28
 Performed by: Sister Sledge. Original version appears on 1979 album We Are Family

Production
 Bernard Edwards - producer for Chic Organization Ltd.
 Nile Rodgers - producer for Chic Organization Ltd.

References

Chic (band) compilation albums
Albums produced by Nile Rodgers
Albums produced by Bernard Edwards
Rhino Records compilation albums
1999 greatest hits albums